Lower Layham is a small village in the civil parish of Layham, in the Babergh district, in the county of Suffolk, England. The village contains St.Andrew's Church (Layham parish church) and a pub, The Queen's Head. The village is separated from Upper Layham by the River Brett.

References
 Philip's Street Atlas Suffolk, 2007 edition. p. 149.

Villages in Suffolk
Babergh District